The 1870 Dublin University by-election was fought on 14 February 1870 in the Dublin University constituency.  The by-election was fought due to the resignation of the incumbent Conservative MP Anthony Lefroy. It was won by the unopposed Conservative candidate David Robert Plunket.

References

1870 elections in the United Kingdom
By-elections to the Parliament of the United Kingdom in Dublin University
Unopposed by-elections to the Parliament of the United Kingdom (need citation)
1870 elections in Ireland